Brunei have participated in the ABU Radio Song Festival three times. The Bruneian broadcaster, Radio Television Brunei, has been the organiser of the Bruneian entry since the country's debut in the contest in 2012.

History

2012
Radio Television Brunei is one of the founder members in the ABU Radio Song Festivals, having participated in the very first ABU Radio Song Festival 2012. Two songs were submitted for the first festival, with only one being selected to go through to the televised final. Maria Aires sang "Yang Terindah" and finished in third place, while Jazz Hayat failed to make it to the televised final.

2014
Brunei participated in the 2014 festival in Colombo, Sri Lanka, two songs were submitted by the Brunei broadcaster for the festival. On 19 March 2014 it was announced that Neff Aslee with the song "Juliet" had been put forward to participate, on 20 March 2014 Rapual Rezal was also announced as a potential participant. On 1 April 2014 it was confirmed that Neff Aslee had been selected to participate in the festival in Colombo.

2015
On 4 December 2014 Brunei confirmed that they would participate in the 3rd festival in Myanmar On 8 April 2015 it was announced that Nurul Huda Fadilah Hj Md Junaidi (Dila) would represent Brunei at the festival, she would sing “Aku Milik Orang”.

Participation overview 
Table key

See also 
 Brunei in the ABU TV Song Festival

References 

Countries at the ABU Song Festival